First Sergeant Albert Adams Clapp (May 1, 1841, to May 8, 1911) was an American soldier who fought in the American Civil War. Clapp received the country's highest award for bravery during combat, the Medal of Honor, for his action during the Battle of Sayler's Creek in Virginia on 6 April 1865. He was honored with the award on 24 April 1865.

Biography
Clapp was born in Pompey, New York, on 1 May 1841. He enlisted into the 2nd Ohio Cavalry. He died on 8 May 1911 and his remains are interred at the San Gabriel Cemetery in California.

Medal of Honor citation

See also

List of American Civil War Medal of Honor recipients: A–F

References

1841 births
1911 deaths
People of Ohio in the American Civil War
Union Army officers
United States Army Medal of Honor recipients
American Civil War recipients of the Medal of Honor
People from Pompey, New York